The 1996 Iowa State Cyclones football team represented Iowa State University during the 1996 NCAA Division I-A football season.  They played their home games at Cyclone Stadium in Ames, Iowa. They participated as members of the newly formed Big 12 Conference with the additions of Baylor, Texas, Texas A&M, and Texas Tech and were in the North Division.  The team was coached by head coach Dan McCarney.

Schedule

Roster

Personnel

References

Iowa State
Iowa State Cyclones football seasons
Iowa State Cyclones football